Spring Green is a village in Sauk County, Wisconsin, United States. The population was 1,628 at the 2010 census. The village is located within the Town of Spring Green.

Geography
Spring Green is located at  (43.177268, -90.067277).

The Wisconsin River runs along the southern edge of the village.

Demographics

2010 census
As of the census of 2010, there were 1,628 people, 690 households, and 433 families living in the village. The racial makeup of the village was 97.5% White, 0.6% African American, 0.2% Native American, 0.1% Asian, 0.1% from other races, and 1.6% from two or more races. Hispanic or Latino of any race were 0.8% of the population.

There were 690 households, of which 31.2% had children under the age of 18 living with them, 50.4% were married couples living together, 8.6% had a female householder with no husband present, 3.8% had a male householder with no wife present, and 37.2% were non-families. 33.3% of all households were made up of individuals, and 18.6% had someone living alone who was 65 years of age or older. The average household size was 2.27 and the average family size was 2.88.

The median age in the village was 42.5 years. 24.3% of residents were under the age of 18; 5% were between the ages of 18 and 24; 24.5% were from 25 to 44; 26.7% were from 45 to 64; and 19.5% were 65 years of age or older. The gender makeup of the village was 47.9% male and 52.1% female.

2000 census
As of the census of 2000, there were 1,444 people, 585 households, and 372 families living in the village. The population density was 1,097.6 people per square mile (422.4/km2). There were 624 housing units at an average density of 474.3 per square mile (182.5/km2). The racial makeup of the village was 99.24% White, 0.14% Black or African American, 0.14% Native American, 0.07% Asian, 0.07% Pacific Islander, 0.07% from other races, and 0.28% from two or more races. 0.14% of the population were Hispanic or Latino of any race.

There were 585 households, out of which 32.1% had children under the age of 18 living with them, 55.0% were married couples living together, 6.3% had a female householder with no husband present, and 36.4% were non-families. 31.5% of all households were made up of individuals, and 15.9% had someone living alone who was 65 years of age or older. The average household size was 2.38 and the average family size was 2.99.

In the village, the population was spread out, with 25.5% under the age of 18, 5.9% from 18 to 24, 28.6% from 25 to 44, 21.8% from 45 to 64, and 18.2% who were 65 years of age or older. The median age was 39 years. For every 100 females, there were 90.3 males. For every 100 females age 18 and over, there were 83.0 males.

The median income for a household in the village was $45,000, and the median income for a family was $51,806. Males had a median income of $36,597 versus $26,296 for females. The per capita income for the village was $21,462. About 3.2% of families and 6.1% of the population were below the poverty line, including 5.4% of those under age 18 and 15.2% of those age 65 or over.

Spring Green and Frank Lloyd Wright
The world-renowned architect Frank Lloyd Wright was born in nearby Richland Center, Wisconsin, studied in Madison, Wisconsin, and spent summers and other times near Spring Green with his mother's family, the Lloyd-Joneses of Wyoming Valley. He became identified with Spring Green when he built the first Taliesin (studio) nearby in 1911 after leaving his Oak Park, Illinois, family, home, and studio with Mamah Borthwick, the wife of an erstwhile client. The disapproval of many area residents only intensified after a disastrous fire and the murder of Borthwick along with her children and a number of workmen by a still-poorly-understood killer in 1914. On the other hand, some Spring Green craftsmen were among Wright's trusted and lifelong favorites.  Taliesin was continuously rebuilt over the years and became a local landmark. Wright was buried in the Lloyd-Jones family cemetery next to Unity Chapel near Taliesin and Spring Green from his death in 1959 until 1985, when his remains were controversially removed after the death of his third wife and widow, cremated and reinterred in Arizona. Especially in the past several decades, growing worldwide appreciation of Wright's legacy has brought increased attention as well as tourism to the Spring Green area. Architects from the Frank Lloyd Wright Foundation, along with Wright-trained architects native to the area, have designed numerous homes and commercial and civic buildings in Spring Green and the surrounding area.

Attractions
 Taliesin, the summer home and school of architect Frank Lloyd Wright, including the Hillside Home School
 American Players Theatre, classical (Shakespeare, etc.) and modern theater, revolving repertory in indoor and outdoor theaters, June–October
 The House on the Rock tourist museum

Media
 Voice of the River Valley, A guide to people & events that inspire, inform and enrich life in the Lower Wisconsin and Sugar-Pecatonica River Basins
 The Spring Green Home News

Notable residents

 Svetlana Alliluyeva, daughter of Soviet dictator Joseph Stalin
 Anne Baxter, Academy Award-winning actress
 Evan Alfred Evans, United States federal court judge
 Isaac C. Evans, Wisconsin State Representative
 Fred Gerber, Jr., South Dakota State Representative
 Carie Graves, Olympic gold medalist, head coach of the Harvard Crimson and Texas Longhorns women's crew teams
 Richard Haas, muralist
 Jenkin Lloyd Jones, Unitarian missionary and minister
 Randall Duk Kim, actor
 Robert McCutchin, Wisconsin State Representative
 Jane Peyton, actress
 John J. Sliter, Minnesota State Representative
 Anthony Weston, philosopher
 Alonzo Wilcox, Wisconsin State Representative
 Frank Lloyd Wright, architect and builder of Taliesin

Images

References

External links

 Village of Spring Green
 Spring Green Area Chamber of Commerce
 Spring Green Community Library
 Sanborn fire insurance maps: 1894 1899 1905 1915

Villages in Wisconsin
Villages in Sauk County, Wisconsin